Parkersburg is the name of some places in the United States:

Parkersburg, West Virginia, the third-largest city in West Virginia
Parkersburg High School
Parkersburg South High School
Parkersburg Catholic High School
Parkersburg, Illinois, a village
Parkersburg, Indiana, an unincorporated place
Parkersburg, Iowa, a small city

See also
South Parkersburg, West Virginia